Astri Riddervold (8 August 1925 − 17 March 2019) was a Norwegian chemist and ethnologist, educator, cook and writer. She is particularly known for her dissemination of food culture and food traditions. Her speciality was ancient food preservation. Riddervold was born in Haugesund, and was educated in both chemistry and ethnology. She was awarded  in 1995.

Selected publications

 (Thesis).

References 

1925 births
2019 deaths
People from Haugesund
Norwegian chemists
Norwegian ethnologists
Women ethnologists
Norwegian food writers
Norwegian women non-fiction writers